Santander may refer to:

Places
 Santander, Spain, a port city and capital of the autonomous community of Cantabria, Spain
 Santander Department, a department of Colombia
 Santander State, former state of Colombia
 Santander de Quilichao, a municipality in the Cauca Department of Colombia
 Santander, Cebu, a municipality in the province of Cebu, Philippines

Banking 
 Banco Santander, a Spanish banking group
 Santander Bank
 Santander UK

People
 Francisco de Paula Santander (1792–1840), Colombian military and political leader born in Cúcuta
 Kike Santander (born 1960), Colombian composer and record producer born in Santiago de Cali
 Gustavo Santander, Colombian composer and brother of Kike Santander
 Luis Enrique Santander, (born 1983) Mexican football referee
 Federico Santander (born 1991), Paraguayan footballer 
 Anthony Santander (born 1994), Venezuelan professional baseball outfielder

Ships
 , a Hansa A Type cargo ship in service 1943–1945
 Santander 30, a British sailboat

Historical events 
 Battle of Santander, a set of 1937 military operations carried out during the Spanish Civil War
 1941 Santander fire, a fire in the city of Santander, Cantabria, Spain

See also 
Norte de Santander Department, a department of Colombia
Puerto Santander (disambiguation)